Daniel Osbourne may refer to:

 Daniel Osbourne (Coronation Street)
 Oz (Buffy the Vampire Slayer) (real name Daniel Osbourne), fictional character in Buffy the Vampire Slayer

See also
 Daniel Osborne (disambiguation)